In Chickasaw mythology, Panti is a fabulous beast with exceptionally lovely teeth which it will exchange for lost baby teeth. It is similar to creatures like the Tooth Fairy and Ratoncito Pérez.

References 

Chickasaw
Legendary creatures of the indigenous peoples of North America
Tooth fairies